The KingBonn Award (Chinese: 金鹏奖) of China International New Media Short Film Festival is by far the only state-recognized and also international short film award in China, which is comprised by Main Competition Section and Internet Voting Section. As one of the principal activities in the festival, creators of short films from home and aboard come to participate in the competition. Domestic and international cinema professionals, scholars, and noted directors will be on the panel to review the candidate shorts and selected the best ones to reward in form of bonus, with the view of encouraging the production of outstanding new media shorts, discovering and supporting talents.

KingBonn Award 

The name of the KingBonn Award is derived from the abbreviated name of Shenzhen City – Pengcheng (Chinese Pinyin, literally meaning "the city of roc"). KingBonn implies that the new media movie-TV-animation industry will thrive and soar.

CSFF 

China International New Media Short Film Festival (CSFF), founded by 2010, is the only state-recognized international short film award in China, with approval from the Publicity Department of the CPC Central Committee, co-sponsored by State General Administration of Press and Publication, Radio, Film and Television and Shenzhen Municipal People’s Government and hosted by Culture, Sports & Tourism Administration of Shenzhen Municipality and Shenzhen Media Group, which is held annually in May during the China (Shenzhen) International Cultural Industries Fair. The major activities be divided into six sections: KingBonn Award Competition, KingBonn Award Ceremony, International Short Film Screenings, New Media Short Forum, New Media Short Film Market and KingBonn Short Film Outdoor Screening Carnival in Guangming.
The China International New Media Short Film Festival is intended to encourage the production of outstanding new media shorts, discover and support new media talents, nurture and incubate innovative new media projects.

KingBonn Award Ceremony 

KingBonn Award Ceremony, as the unique platform for KingBonn Award result announcement, is one of the most ceremonious activities, which will be live telecasted globally by the Shenzhen Media Group Channels and the domestic mainstream online video networks.

Awards Setting 
The three main categories of entries accepted by KingBonn Award include fiction, animation and documentary shorts which should be less than 20 minutes and completed after January 1 of the previous one year and are not previously submitted to the KingBonn Award. One selection is held per year.

Main Competition Section 
 Best KingBonn Short Film
 Best Fiction
 Best Documentary
 Best Animation
 Best Director
 Best University Student MicroFilm

Internet Competition Section 
 Best Internet Short Film
 Best Comedy
 Best Handset Short Film

International Jury Panel of KingBonn Award Selection 

The 1st KingBonn Award (2010)

President: Xiaogang FENG(China)Members:Chris Edward(USA),Royston TAN(Singapore),Juan WEN(HongKong, China),Weijiang WANG(Tawan, China),Nishimura Junji(Japan),Yumin MA(China)

The 2nd KingBonn Award (2011)President: Chuan LU (China)

Members: Roger Gonin(France),Gunter Grossholz(Germany),Weijiang WANG(Tawan, China),Renzhong HUANG(China),Haicheng ZHAO(China),Guochang LIU(HongKong, China),Jianying GONG(China)

The 3rd KingBonn Award (2012)President: Xiaoshuai WANG (China)
Members: Richard L.Anderson(USA),Zita Carvalhosa(Brazil),Pavel Jech(Czech),Tianming LU(China),Xingguo LI(China),Lijun SUN(China)

The 4th KingBonn Award (2013)

President: Chuan LU (China)Members: David Freeman(USA),Herman Van Eyken(Australia),Steve Solot(Brazil),Xiangzhong LIAO(China),Bing ZHOU(China),Dasheng ZHENG(China),Xuebing WANG(China),Ze WANG(China)

The 5th KingBonn Award (2014)President: QuanAn WANG (China)

Members: Richard Taylor(New Zealand),Jacques Cluzaud(France),Marta Etura(Spain),Konstantin Bronzit(Russia),Ban WANG(China),Lu HUANG(China)

The 6th KingBonn Award (2015)President: Peter CHAN (Hong Kong, China)
Members: Hong TAO(China),Carter Pilcher(UK),David K.Irving(USA),Royston TAN(Singapore),Xiangzhong LIAO(China),William FENG(China)

Award Lists

The 1st China International (KingBonn) New Media Short Film Festival

The 2nd China International (KingBonn) New Media Short Film Festival

The 3rd China International (KingBonn) New Media Short Film Festival

The 4th China International (KingBonn) New Media Short Film Festival

The 5th China International (KingBonn) New Media Short Film Festival

The 6th China International (KingBonn) New Media Short Film Festival

References 

Chinese film awards